Haresh Sharma (born 1965) is a Singaporean playwright. To date, he has written more than 100 plays that have been staged all over the world, including Singapore, Melbourne, Glasgow, Birmingham, Cairo and London. Sharma has a BA from the National University of Singapore as well as an MA in Playwriting from the University of Birmingham, obtained in 1994 on a Shell-NAC Scholarship. He has also been awarded fellowships and grants by the British Council and the United States Information Service, and was conferred the Young Artist Award in 1997. His play, Still Building, was awarded a Merit Singapore Literature Prize in 1993 while Off Centre was selected by the Ministry of Education as a Literature text for 'N’ and 'O’ levels, and republished by The Necessary Stage in 2006. In 2014, Sharma was awarded the prestigious S.E.A. Write Award. In 2015, he was awarded the Cultural Medallion.

Early live and education
Born in Singapore, Sharma attended Tanjong Katong Secondary School, Temasek Junior College, as well as the National University of Singapore(NUS), where he majored in English Language and Literature. It was also at the National University of Singapore in 1987 where he met Alvin Tan, then a fellow undergraduate and founder of The Necessary Stage. He soon became involved in productions – first doing backstage, publicity, sound, and the occasional acting – then eventually moving on to scriptwriting when one of his plays won the NUS-Shell Short Play Competition in 1988.

Career 
In 1990, after graduation from NUS, Sharma became the resident playwright of The Necessary Stage (TNS)

In 1991, Sharma wrote his ninth play, This Chord and Others, which was put into production by TNS. Sharma also made his first performance in the play, acting as Sukdev.

In August 2007, a new volume of Interlogue: Studies in Singapore Literature, was published with a focus on the works of Sharma. Interlogue is a series published by Ethos Books and edited by A/P Kirpal Singh that aims to bring critical focus on the works of Singapore writers in English. Previous editions of the series included one each on fiction, poetry, drama and interviews with local writers, as well as one dedicated volume on Singapore playwright Robert Yeo. The publication, written by Prof David Birch and edited by A/P Kirpal Singh, was an extensive investigation into Sharma's development as a writer; the themes and issues he grapples with; as well as his vision and practice of theatre within and outside his work at The Necessary Stage. While Interlogue itself was not published by The Necessary Stage, the company assisted with the provision of archival material for Prof Birch's research.

In 2010, The Necessary Stage published a new anthology of Haresh's plays entitled Trilogy, including the scripts and production notes of three award-winning works, Fundamentally Happy, Good People and Gemuk Girls. The script of Those Who Can't, Teach, which was restaged as part of the 2010 Singapore Arts Festival, was published by Epigram Books. In 2011, a collection of early short plays by Haresh Sharma entitled Shorts I was published by The Necessary Stage. In 2012, two collections of Sharma's scripts were published, one entitled Shorts 2, and the other entitled Plays for Schools. This was followed by the publication of a new collection of Sharma's plays on medical-related issues entitled Don't Forget to Remember Me in 2013, launched at the Singapore Writers Festival. In 2014, Sharma's play Best Of (staged four times to rave reviews in Singapore and Malaysia) and Eclipse (staged in both Singapore and Scotland) were published.

Sharma also wrote the lyrics to Singapore's National Day Parade 2011's withdrawn "Fun Pack Song", which modified the lyrics of Lady Gaga's 'Bad Romance' to widespread criticism and was subsequently withdrawn from the national day parade.

In 2015, Fundamentally Happy was selected by The Business Times as one of the "finest plays in 50 years" alongside productions by Goh Poh Seng, Michael Chiang and Alfian Sa'at and others.

Selected Plays

 1989: Lanterns Never Go Out
 1990: Those Who Can't, Teach
 1993: Off Centre
 1993: Waiting
 1994: Three Years in the Life and Death of Land
 1995: Top of the World
 1995: Rosnah
 1997: One Day at a Time
 1998: Pillars
 1998: Walking into Doors
 1999: Completely With/Out Character
 1999: The Exodus
 2000: History, Whose Story?
 2000: Untitled (Women Number One)
 2001: One Hundred Years in Waiting (co-writer)
 2001: Ah Boy and the Beanstalk
 2001: Untitled (Cow Number One)
 2002: godeatgod
 2003: Revelations
 2003: Koan
 2003: Hamlet
 2004: Such Sweet Sorrow
 2004: Mardi Gras, Top & Bottom
 2005: What Big Bombs You Have!!!
 2005: Boxing Day
 2006: Mobile
 2006: Fundamentally Happy
 2006: Divine Soap
 2007: Survivor Singapore
 2008: Gemuk Girls
 2008: Eclipse
 2010: Model Citizens
 2013: Best Of
 2014: Poor Thing
 2014: Gitanjali [I feel the earth move]
 2015: Pioneer (Girls) Generation
 2019: Cluster Fish

Publications
 Still Building (1994, EPB Publishers) 
 This Chord and Others (1999, Minerva Press) 
 Koan (2003, The Necessary Stage) 
 Lanterns (2003, The Necessary Stage)
 Mardi Gras (2004, The Necessary Stage) 
 Off Centre (2006, The Necessary Stage; 2010, Ethos Books)  
 Fundamentally Happy (2006, The Necessary Stage)
 Good People (2007, The Necessary Stage)
 Shorts 1 (2010, The Necessary Stage) 
 Those Who Can't, Teach (2010, Epigram Books) 
 Trilogy (2010, The Necessary Stage) 
 哈里斯·沙玛剧作选 (2010, 八方文化创作室) 
 Shorts 2 (2011, The Necessary Stage) 
 Model Citizens (2012, Epigram Books) 
 Plays for Schools (2012, The Necessary Stage) 
 Don't Forget to Remember Me (2013, The Necessary Stage) 
 Best Of (2014, The Necessary Stage) 
 Eclipse (2014, The Necessary Stage)

References

2. Birch, David; Kirpal Singh (ed) (2007). Interlogue – Studies in Singapore Literature, Volume 6: Haresh Sharma; The Cultural Politics of Playwriting in Contemporary Singapore: Ethos Books.

External links 
The Necessary Stage
M1 Singapore Fringe Festival
Doollee.com's Webpage on Haresh Sharma

1965 births
Living people
National University of Singapore alumni
Singaporean people of Indian descent
Theatre in Singapore
Singaporean Hindus
Temasek Junior College alumni
Singaporean dramatists and playwrights
Singapore Literature Prize winners
Singaporean writers
S.E.A. Write Award winners